Talanga quadristigmalis is a species of moth of the family Crambidae. It was described by George Hamilton Kenrick in 1907 and is found in Papua New Guinea.

It has a wingspan of 32 mm.

References

External links

Moths described in 1907
Spilomelinae